Sangagiri or 'Sankari' is a state assembly constituency in Salem district, Tamil Nadu, India. Its State Assembly Constituency number is 87. It comprises Sangagiri taluk and a portion of Omalur taluk. It is a part of the wider Namakkal constituency for national elections to the Parliament of India. Elections and winners in the constituency are listed below. The constituency is in existence since 1957 election. It is one of the 234 State Legislative Assembly Constituencies in Tamil Nadu, in India.

Demographics
Kongu Vellalar Gounder and Vanniyar communities are numerically high in this constituency followed by Senguntha Mudaliar, Sozhiya Vellalar, Muslims, and Adi Dravida communities.

Madras State

Tamil Nadu

Election Results

2021

2016

2011

2006

2001

1996

1991

1989

1984

1980

1977

1971

1967

1962

1957

References 

 

Assembly constituencies of Tamil Nadu
Salem district